Prat Samakrat (born October 31, 1985), is a Thai  professional footballer who played as a centre-back.

International goals

Honours

Club
Dragon Pathumwan Kanchanaburi
Thai League 3 Western Region: 2022–23

International
Thailand U-23
 Sea Games 
  Gold Medal (2) ; 2005, 2007

External links
 
 Profile at Goal
https://int.soccerway.com/players/prat-samakrat/10799/

References

1985 births
Living people
Prat Samakrat
Prat Samakrat
Association football central defenders
Prat Samakrat
Prat Samakrat
Prat Samakrat
Prat Samakrat
Prat Samakrat
Footballers at the 2006 Asian Games
Prat Samakrat
Southeast Asian Games medalists in football
Competitors at the 2005 Southeast Asian Games
Competitors at the 2007 Southeast Asian Games
Prat Samakrat